Mush Bijar (also Romanized as Mūsh Bījār; also known as Musmudzhal) is a village in Blukat Rural District, Rahmatabad and Blukat District, Rudbar County, Gilan Province, Iran. At the 2006 census, its population was 59, in 18 families.

References 

Populated places in Rudbar County